Ray Klinginsmith is a social activist fighting for the rights of the disabled, and is the former World President of Rotary International.

Notes

Rotary International leaders
Living people
American disability rights activists
University of Cape Coast alumni
Year of birth missing (living people)